MV Sugar Transporter was a British built Bulk carrier. It was launched on 25 March 1970 and was sunk at anchorage off Socotra Island near the Horn of Africa in 1991. It was also named the Kefalonia Wind, Sea Transporter, and Sunset. The ship was owned by the Sugar Line Limited, as well as Oceanfever Marine.

References

Bulk carriers
Maritime incidents in 1991
Shipwrecks in the Indian Ocean
1970 ships